Gopishantha (26 May 1937 – 10 October 2015), better known by her stage name Manorama, also called  Aachi, was an Indian actress, playback singer and comedian who had appeared in more than 1000 films and 5000 stage performances and several television series predomninantely in the Tamil language until 2015. She was a recipient of the Kalaimamani award. In 2002, Government of India awarded Manorama the Padma Shri for her contribution to the arts. She received the National Film Award for Best Supporting Actress for her performance in the film Pudhiya Padhai (1989) and Filmfare Lifetime Achievement Award – South (1995).

Early life
Manorama was born to Kasiyappan Kilakudaiyar and Ramamirtham in Mannargudi, a town in the erstwhile Thanjavur district of Madras Presidency. Her mother brought her up by taking up a job as a maid. She mentioned her indebtedness to her mother for her success: Many of the mother roles that she has played in films resemble her own mother. Her family moved to Pallathur near Karaikudi owing to poverty. While in Pallathur, her mother had started vomiting out blood, hence Manorama decided to start working as a maid and dropped out of school at the age of 11. Once a drama troupe had come to Pallathur, but the actress who was to play a small part, suddenly dropped out due to her inability to sing and the troupe was looking for an artiste who could act and sing as well. The drama troupe decided to give her this role in the drama titled Andhaman Kadhali. Hence her acting career began at the age of twelve, acting in plays. During this time, she was rechristened Manorama by one of her dramas' director Thiruvengadam and harmonist Thiayagarajan. Manorama went and met S S Rajendran (SSR) when he camped at her native district with his drama troupe. She was selected for a role in his ManiMagudam drama written by Kalaignar M Karunanidhi.She continued to act in plays and performed as a playback singer as well. After watching her performance in plays, she was offered her first film, named Inbavazhvu, by Janakiraman, which remained 40% incomplete and later Kannadasan offered her lead role in a second film, Unmayinkottai, which got shelved after shooting for about 40%. She lost hope of becoming a film actor when both these films remained incomplete.

Manorama fell in love with her manager in the drama troupe; S. M. Ramanathan and married him in 1954; the couple have a son named Bhoopathy born in 1955. However, they divorced in 1956 and started to live separately in Chennai. She quoted in an interview in 2015, "My mom wanted me to study medicine. But it was not easy to become a doctor in those days, and I became an actress. So, if I hadn't taken up acting, I would have tried to become a doctor as my mom wished for it. But now, fortunately, my grandson is a doctor, and I am proud of it."

Early career
She acted in small roles in few Vairam Nataka Sabha dramas. Once she went to see a drama of S. S. Rajendran, who was residing at Pudukkotai, in Tamil Nadu, and P.A. Kumar introduced her to Rajendran. She showed her skill in dialogue delivery and was offered a job in S.S.R. Nataka Mandram company and played in hundreds of stage productions all over the district: The dramas included Manimagudam, Thenpandiveeran and Pudhuvellam. She credits her work in Manimagudam as where she was first recognized as an actress. She then took part in an unfinished film starring S. S. Rajendran and Devika.

Career

She migrated from dramas to the silver screen with the role of a heroine in the 1958 Tamil film Malayitta Mangai: Kannadasan gave her the lead role in this film. The first film in which she played the heroine was the 1963 Konjum Kumari. Then, she concentrated more on comedy from 1960. She was given equally challenging roles alongside the well known comedian Nagesh in 50 films.

When asked in an interview as to how she got into films, she quoted, "It's all because of Kannadasan. It was he who changed my life by casting me in the film Maalayitta Mangai in 1957. It was a comical role, and he trusted me so much and said that I will be able to pull it off. I was very doubtful about it, but he told me, "If you are going to act in films only as a heroine, people here will throw you out of the industry after three or four years, but doing such roles will take you places. And you have the talent, too, to reach higher peaks." That is when I got confidence and continued doing comedy roles."

The first time Manorama stood before the camera was for a Sinhalese film Sukumali in 1947, in which she played the heroine's friend. Her dance master Suryakala recommended her to the director Masthaan to play the role. She has acted predominantly in Tamil films since 1958, but also acted in Telugu, Hindi, Malayalam and Kannada movies as well. Her on-screen pair with Tangavelu was appreciated in the film Vallvanakku Vallavan in 1965. Her on-screen pair with Nagesh was very popular in 1960–69 and then with Cho in the 1970s and 80s and later with Thengai Srinivasan, Vennira Aadai Moorthy, and Surali Rajan in the 70s and 80s. She had done playback singing for 300 songs, mostly pictured on herself, in Tamil films. The first song that she sang was in a film called Magale Un Samathu, composed by G. K. Venkatesh and this opportunity she got due to the film's producer P.A. Kumar. She has sung a classical-based song with TM Sounderajan in the film Dharshinam (1970), where she was paired with Cho. Manorama sang a song with L.R. Eswari named "Thaatha thaatha pidi kudu". Her career's biggest hit song sung by herself was Vaa Vaathiyaare Uttaande composed by music director V. Kumar for the film ''Bommalattam", which was picturised on her and Cho. She also sang for M. S. Viswanathan and A. R. Rahman.

Some of her best Tamil films include Anbe Vaa, Thenmazhi, Ethir Neechal, Galatta Kalyanam, Chittukuruvi, Durga Devi, Annalakshmi and Imayam. In Telugu, she starred in films such as Rikshavodu, Krishnarjuna and Subhodayam. When asked in an interview as to which are her memorable roles, she said "It is Nadigan, which had Sathyaraj and Khushbu in the lead. I cannot forget that role of Baby Amma in my life. Also my role in Chinna Gounder, for which I had to sport weird, artificial teeth, is something which I always think about.

Manorama was paired with Nagesh regularly in films with M.G. Ramachandran in lead like En Kadamai, Kanni Thai, Thayin Madiyil, Kadhal Vaganam, Chandrodhyam, Anbee Vaa, Padagotti, Kadhal Vagahnam, Vivasaaye, Thaikku Thalaimagan, Vettikaran and Ther Thiruvizha. Other directors cast the Nagesh-Manorama pair in films like Anubhavi Raja Anubhavi, Kungumam, Saraswathi Sabadham, Panjavarnakilli, Navarathiri, Puthiya Paravai, Patthu Matha Bandham, Anbu Karangal, Micheal Madan Kamarajan, Annamitta Kai, Gowri Kalyanam, Anbe Aaruyire, Server Sundaram, Ner Vazhai, Ninaivin Nindraval, Poojaikku Vandamalar, Deiva Thirumagal, Rakta Thilagam, Aannavin Asai, Thiruvarutchelvar, Seetha and Karunthel Kannayiram. Manorama, actress Sachu and Jayalalithaa have acted together in 2 films as a combination — Galata Kalyanam and Bommalattam. Manorama and Jayalalithaa have acted in 25 films together.

Her work was noticed even among stalwarts like Sivaji Ganesan and Natiya Peroli Padmini. Manorama shared in an interview that initially she was nervous acting in front of veterans like T. S. Balaiah, but, the director A. P. Nagarajan made her understand that the scenes in which Jil Jil Ramamani appears, she would be the center of attention. She acted alongside the well-known comedian Nagesh in 50 films and in 20 films with Cho Ramaswamy. They made a notable pair and acted in many well-received comedies. In 1974 she shared the screen space with the legendary comedian Mehmood in the Hindi movie Kunwara Baap. Cho and Manorama were paired together in 20 films which included Malligai Poo, Annaiyum Pidhavum, Dharisanam, Anbai Thedi, Nanaivin Nindraval, Nirai Kudam, Ayiram Poi, Mohammed Bin Tughlaq, Bommalattam, Delhi Mappilai, Vilayattu Pillai, Kanavan, Rojavin Raja and Suryagandhi.

The character she was given by K. Balachander in the 1989 film Unnal Mudiyum Thambi she personally considers a cornerstone as she was giving a new challenge as an actor. She related in an interview on Toronto TV that one of the most challenging characters she played was the role of the 50-year-old unmarried woman in the 1990 film Nadigan with Sathyaraj. She has acted with all of the lead comedians across five different generations, which includes M. R. Radha, K. A. Thangavelu, J. P. Chandrababu, A. Karunanithi, Ennatha Kannaiya, V. K. Ramasamy, Nagesh, Cho Ramaswamy, Thengai Seenivasan, M. R. R. Vasu, Suruli Rajan, Vennira Aadai Moorthy, Janagaraj, Pandiarajan, Goundamani, Senthil, Vivek and Vadivelu.

She has been in films with five chief ministers. She played the female lead in the plays written, directed and acted by C. N. Annadurai, former chief minister of Tamil Nadu. She has also appeared in plays with another chief minister of Tamil Nadu, M. Karunanidhi. She has acted in films with M. G. Ramachandran and J. Jayalalithaa, who both later became chief ministers of Tamil Nadu later. She has also acted in Telugu films with Dr. N. T. Rama Rao, who became the chief minister of Andhra Pradesh. When asked which character of hers she found most hilarious to play, she specified the role of a talkative female, who is forced to act dumb in a film called Unakkum Vazhvu Varum. She had played this role along with Thengai Srinivasan. She was bitten by a Bungarus fasciatus/ Kattuviriyan snake during the shooting of Manjal Kungumam and was admitted to hospital. Coincidentally, after recovery, the next scene, she had to act was in ''Aadi Viradham,'' where she had to bathe a snake statue and sing a lullaby for it, and the director asked her whether she would like to perform and she replied "Yes very much!" and she did the film.

Manorama, being a close friend of Jayalalithaa and of the firm belief that Jayalalithaa would never be corrupt, campaigned against actor Rajinikanth in support of Chief Minister Jayalalithaa in the 1996 elections.

In one of her last interviews, in 2015, she was asked if she had any regrets about her life. To this, she answered: "I've no regrets at all. I'm blessed in this life. Even in my next birth, I want to be born as Manorama again. I want this same life, and same people around me. Most of all, I want my mom with me again." In an interview to BBC in 2015, "If I had chosen to act only as a heroine then I would have disappeared from the scene long ago. So, I decided to take up comedienne roles, so I survived in the industry for nearly six decades".

When asked as to how she was able to do more than 1500 films, she said in her interview in September 2015, "I believe I am a blessed person. Without God's will, I couldn't have acted in so many films. It all just happened in my life, and you won't believe it, but I still have the urge to act. The one person who is the reason for all my success is my mom. She did everything for me in life, and I miss her the most now (she breaks into tears). Whatever I achieve or have achieved in life is only because of her."

She supported young talents and budding directors in her old age. In 2013 she acted in a Tamil short film named Thaaye Nee Kannurangu, directed by LGR Saravanan. She acted as a cancer patient and a mother of Mr. Srikanth.

Death
Between 2013 and 2015, Manorama had suffered ill-health resulting in hospital stays. She died in Chennai at 11.20 pm on 10 October 2015 as a result of multiple organ failure at the age of 78.

Reactions
Tamil Nadu reacted to Manorama's death with an outpouring of grief; numerous tributes were paid to the deceased actor across the state and on social media. Chief Minister Jayalalithaa laid a wreath on the body at the actor's home in T. Nagar, Ms. Jayalalithaa said, "There had been no accomplished achiever like Manorama in the Tamil film world and there would be none in the future as well." Jayalalitha was quoted as saying, "I was shocked to hear about her death. She was an elder sister to me. I used to call her Manorama while she called me Ammu. We used to visit each other's houses whenever we didn't have shootings." The chief minister also said, "If Sivaji Ganesan was Nadigar Thilagam, Manorama was Nadigai Thilagam." Others who paid homage to the actress include Rajinikanth, Vijay, Kamal Haasan, Vikram, Sivakumar, Dhanush, Ajith Kumar, M. Karunanidhi, K. Veeramani, G. K. Vasan, Delhi Ganesh, R. Sarathkumar, Ilayaraja, Vairamuthu, Karthik, S. Ve. Shekhar, Vijayakumar, Goundamani, K. Bhagyaraj, R. Parthiban, Raadhika, Vimal, Silambarasan, Suriya, Karthi, Vikraman, S. Thanu, T. Rajender and Pandiarajan.

Awards and honors

 Guinness book of records - Guinness Record (1985) for acting in more than 1000 films.
 Padma Shri - 2002

Discography
Manorama also holds a record of singing for all the notable music directors. She has rendered her voice for M. S. Viswanathan, Ilayaraja, A. R. Rahman and many other notable music composers.

References

External links
 
 Profile at Nilacharal
 Aachi Manorama on Moviebuff

1937 births
2015 deaths
Indian film actresses
Recipients of the Padma Shri in arts
Indian Tamil people
Best Supporting Actress National Film Award winners
Actresses in Tamil cinema
Actresses in Telugu cinema
Actresses in Hindi cinema
Actresses in Malayalam cinema
20th-century Indian actresses
21st-century Indian actresses
Indian women comedians
People from Tiruvarur district
Tamil comedians
Telugu comedians
Actresses from Tamil Nadu
Malayalam comedians
Actresses in Malayalam television
Actresses in Tamil television
Actresses in Kannada cinema